The Tarvasjõgi is a river in Estonia. It is also called the Mõnuvere. It is a tributary of the Jäneda which in turn flows into the Jägala and thence into the Baltic Sea. The Tarvasjõgi begins near the Piibe Highway (a historic road that connects Tallinn and Tartu).

The river starts at Piibe Road, 5 km southwest of Peedu village. This place is located in the Lääne-Viru County, south of Jäneda and Kõrveküla in Tapa Parish. It flows south until it reaches Järva Parish in Järva County and then continues further southwest. In Mõnuvere village, it turns northwest and reaches the Põhja-Kõrvemaa Nature Reserve, through which it flows for the rest of its course. At the point where it crosses the road between Jäneda and Alavere, it reaches the border of Harju County and continues as the border river of Järva and Harju County. Shortly before its mouth, it enters Harju County, Anija Parish. After one kilometre, it joins the Jäneda which in turn flows into the Jägala and thence the Baltic Sea.

The scenery was formed by the retreat of the glaciers about 12,000 years ago. The land has extensive lakes, bogs, eskers, sand and gravel kames, fens and heaths, with 40 percent forest cover. It provides a habitat for wolves, Eurasian lynxes and brown bears, and protected bird species include black storks, golden eagles, western capercaillies and common cranes.

References

Rivers of Estonia